The Mercedes-Benz M278 is a family of direct injected, Bi-turbocharged, V8 gasoline automotive piston engines.

The M278 is derived from the company's previous M273 V8 engine, sharing its bore pitch, aluminium engine block, and Silitec aluminium/silicon low-friction cylinder liners. In contrast to the port-injected M273, the M278 features gasoline direct injection, with piezo-electrically actuated fuel injectors for more precise fuel delivery, and multi-spark ignition, which enables the spark plugs to be fired multiple times over the combustion sequence for more efficient combustion. Other changes relative to the M273 include an increased adjustment range for the variable valve timing system, a new timing chain arrangement, and new engine accessories (such as the oil pump, water pump, fuel pump, and alternator) which reduce parasitic loads. Many of these new features are shared with the M276 V6 engine family, which was announced at the same time.

While the M273 was naturally aspirated, the M278 features twin turbochargers from Honeywell, one per cylinder bank, producing  boost pressure in most configurations. 

Mercedes-Benz estimates that these changes, in conjunction with vehicle modifications such as a stop-start system, allow the 4.7–litre M278 to have 22% lower fuel consumption and CO2 emissions than the 5.5–litre M273 while producing more power  versus  and torque  versus . The M278 is also more refined than its predecessor.

The entire M278 lineup avoids the United States Gas Guzzler Tax, a first for V8 production engines from Mercedes-Benz.

M278
Although it no longer corresponds with the engine displacement, all of the above models are still badged as "550". The GL-Class, besides the GL550 above, also features the GL450 trim that carries a detuned version of the 4.7 L engine making  and 

These engines are mated to the 7G-Tronic 7-speed automatic transmission, and the new 9G-Tronic 9-speed automatic transmission.

Applications:
 2011–2017 S 500/S 550
 2011–2014 CL 500/CL 550
 2015-2017 S 500 Coupé/S 550 Coupé
 2011–2018 CLS 500/CLS 550
 2012–2020 SL 500/SL 550
 2012–2014 E 500/E 550
 2012-2014 ML 500/ML 550
 2013–2014 GL 450
 2013–2019 GL 500/GLS 500/GL 550/GLS 550
 2016–present BAIC BJ90 (an SUV from Chinese brand BAIC based on the second generation Mercedes-Benz GL-Class)

M157
The second variant, designated M157, is tuned by Mercedes-AMG for use in higher-performance models.

There are six states of output with the M157.

These engines are mated to the AMG Speedshift MCT 7-speed semi-automatic transmission, which replaces the 7G-Tronic's torque converter with a wet clutch pack. Note that this MCT 7-speed can handle considerably more torque and is not the same unit as the dual-clutch transmission found on the Mercedes-Benz SLS AMG.

Applications:
 2011–2013 S 63 AMG
 2013-2017 S 63 AMG
 2011–2014 CL 63 AMG
 2012–2018 CLS 63 AMG
 2012–2015 ML 63 AMG
 2015–2019 AMG GLE 63
 2012–2016 GL 63 AMG
 2016–2019 AMG GLS 63
 2013–2018 G 63 AMG
 2012–2016 E 63 AMG
 2012–2019 SL 63 AMG

The M157 engine will replace the previous M156 in most of the AMG lineup. Despite the 5.5–litre displacement, all models are designated "63" for marketing purposes.

M152

The third variant, designated M152, is a naturally aspirated derivative of the M157 engine, sharing the same displacement, direct injection, and many other features. The M152 engine includes a cylinder deactivation variable displacement system for improved fuel economy (up to 30 percent better than the M113 E55 engine used in the previous model).

Applications
2012–2016 SLK 55 AMG

References

M278
V8 engines
Gasoline engines by model